Violant of Hungary (c. 1215 – c. 1251) was the queen of Aragon from 1235 until 1251 as the second wife of King James I of Aragon. A member of the Hungarian House of Árpád, Queen Violant was a valuable and influential advisor of her husband. She remains in folk memory in Catalonia and Valencia.

Family
Violant was born at Esztergom circa 1215, the only child of King Andrew II of Hungary and his second wife, Yolanda of Courtenay. Violant married King James I of Aragon in 1235. James had already been married to Eleanor of Castile, but he had this marriage annulled on the basis of consanguinity in 1229. He and Eleanor had a son, Alfonso, who was considered legitimate, but who died before James.

James and Violant had ten children:
Violant (1236–1301), Queen of Castile by her marriage to Alfonso X of Castile
 Constance (1239–1269)
 Peter III of Aragon (1240–1285)
 James II of Majorca (1243–1311)
 Ferdinand (1245–1250)
 Sancha (1246–1251)
 Isabella (1247–1271), Queen of France by her marriage to Philip III of France
 Maria (1248–1267), nun
 Sancho (1250–1275), Archbishop of Toledo
 Eleanor (born 1251, died young)

Queenship 
A large number of Hungarian knights escorted the queen to her new homeland with the leadership of Denis of Hungary. Queen Violant was a woman of talent and character. Next to King James I, she had an important political role in the Crown of Aragon. She was one of the most valuable advisors of the king, on whom she had a strong influence. She intervened decisively in international agreements as important as the Treaty of Almizra with Castile (1244). It was signed with the condition that Zayyan ibn Mardanish surrender of the city of Valencia, into which she triumphantly entered with her husband on 9 October 1238.

Death and burial 
Violant reportedly died in September 1251. Jerónimo Zurita, in his Anales de Aragon, mentions this discrepancy, and writes that while some annals state that Violant died in Santa María de Salas in 1251, others report that she lived for a few years after (the probable sources of the 1253 date), and that she only made her will and testament in Huesca in 1251. Zurita continues that her will stipulated her burial at Vallbona, bequeathed the county of Posana (Pozsony) to her sons Peter, James, and Sancho (Pozsony being in the possession of her half-brother Béla IV of Hungary, but apparently left to her by her mother Queen Yolanda), and mentioned that she had 5 daughters with the king.

Violant and her daughter Sancha's remains are at the Monastery of Santa Maria de Vallbona in Vallbona de les Monges, Catalonia. Violant chose burial in that monastery, as she was a benefactor. Her tomb, placed along the wall on the right of the chancel, is fairly simple. It is raised on two pillars decorated with individual gold crosses inscribed in red (gules) circles, and has a gabled lid of white stone. In the center of the lid is a cross with the same characteristics as those on the pillars, but larger and without color. The only ornamentations on the box itself are three depictions of her husband's royal coat of arms – one on the visible side and one at each end. The Queen's remains were moved to the tomb in 1275, as indicated by the inscription on the visible side of the box: Fuit translata donna | Violán regina | Aragonum | anno 1275. In 2002, the Hungarian government financed a restoration of her tomb, costing 12,000 euros, but the monastic community denied permission to study its interior. Violant is the only member of the Árpád dynasty whose remains are undisturbed.

James I remarried one more time, to Teresa Gil de Vidaure, who was previously his mistress.

Posterity 
Since the nineteenth century, streets have been dedicated to Queen Violant in Barcelona, Zaragoza, and other cities in the counties and kingdoms of the former Crown of Aragon. 9 October is the national day of the Valencian Community, which commemorates the Christian reconquest and the day on which James I and Violant entered the city. The celebration is known as the Mocadorada of Sant Dionís, since 9 October is the feast day of Saint Denis of Paris. Men typically give their partners a scarf (mocador) containing candied fruits and vegetables made of marzipan; these candies represent the fruits and vegetables that Valencian Muslims offered James and Violant when they entered the city, according to legend.

References

Sources

|-

|-

|-

1215 births
1253 deaths
13th-century Hungarian people
13th-century people from the Kingdom of Aragon
13th-century Hungarian women
13th-century Spanish women
Hungarian princesses
Aragonese queen consorts
Majorcan queens consort
Consorts of Montpellier
Countesses of Barcelona
House of Árpád
Hungarian people of French descent
Hungarian people of Belgian descent
Hungarian emigrants to Spain
Spanish people of Serbian descent
Spanish people of French descent
Spanish people of Belgian descent
People from Esztergom
Daughters of kings